Trina Scott may refer to

 Trina Grimes Scott Edwards, reality TV star with Edwin Edwards, four-time governor of Louisiana
 Trina Olinde Scott, first female mayor of New Roads, Louisiana